The following list of fleet and grand admirals is a summary of those individuals who have held the rank of fleet admiral, or its equivalent, as the senior officers of their countries' navies.

Austria-Hungary
 1911 – Archduke Charles Stephen of Austria (1860–1933)
 5 May 1916 – Anton Haus (1851–1917)
 9 October 1916 – Prinz Heinrich of Prussia (1862–1929)
 1 November 1916 – Charles I of Austria (1887–1922)
 22 February 1917 – Emperor William II of Germany (1859–1941)

China
Zheng He (1371–1433)
Shi Lang (1621–1696)
Xiao Jingguang (1903–1989)

Croatia
 March 1996 – Sveto Letica (1926–2001)

Egypt
 King Fuad I (1868–1936)
 King Farouk (1920–1965)
 26 July 1952 – King Fuad II (born 1952)

France
 1340 – Hugues Quiéret (1290–1340)
 1341 – Luis de la Cerda (1291–1348)
 1373 – Jean de Vienne (1341–1396)
 1421 – Louis de Culant (1360–1444)
 1437 – André de Laval-Montmorency (1408–1485)
 1450 – Jean V de Bueil (1406–1477)
 1521 – Guillaume Gouffier de Bonnivet (1488–1525)
 1525 – Philippe de Chabot (1492–1543)
 1552 – Gaspard de Coligny (1519–1572)
 1582 – Anne de Joyeuse (1560–1587)
 1587 – Jean Louis de Nogaret de La Valette (1554–1642)
 1592 – Charles de Gontaut, duc de Biron (1562–1602)
 1612 – Henri II de Montmorency (1595–1632)
 1651 – César de Bourbon, duc de Vendôme (1594–1665)
 1683 – Louis-Alexandre de Bourbon, Comte de Toulouse (1678–1737)
 1737 – Louis Jean Marie de Bourbon, duc de Penthièvre (1725–1793)
 2 February 1805 – Joachim Murat (1767–1815)
 1814 – Louis-Antoine, Duke of Angoulême (1775–1844)
 1831 – Laurent Truguet (1752–1839)
 1840 – Albin Roussin (1781–1854)
 1854 – Charles Baudin (1792–1854)
 1854 – Ferdinand Alphonse Hamelin (1796–1864)
 1854 – Alexandre Ferdinand Parseval-Deschenes (1790–1860)
 1855 – Armand Joseph Bruat (1796–1855)
 1860 – Prince Napoléon (1822–1891)
 1860 – Joseph Romain-Desfossés (1798–1864)
 27 January 1864 – Charles Rigault de Genouilly (1807–1873)
 15 November 1864 – Léonard Charner (1797–1869)
 20 February 1869 – François Thomas Tréhouart (1798–1873)
 1939 – François Darlan (1881–1942)

Germany
 1871 – Prince Adalbert (1811–1873)
 1901 – Emperor Wilhelm II (1859–1941)
 1901 – King Oscar II of Sweden (1829–1907)
 28 June 1905 – Hans von Koester (1844–1928)
 4 September 1909 – Prinz Heinrich of Prussia (1862–1929)
 27 January 1911 – Alfred von Tirpitz (1849–1930)
 31 May 1918 – Henning von Holtzendorff (1853–1919)
 1 April 1939 – Erich Raeder (1876–1960)
 30 January 1943 – Karl Dönitz (1891–1980)

Greece
 WWII – King George II of Greece (1890–1947)

Iraq
 King Faisal I (1883–1933)

Italy
 4 November 1924 – Conte Paolo Thaon di Revel (1859–1948)

Japan
 20 January 1898 – Marquis Tsugumichi Saigo (1843–1902)
 31 January 1906 – Sukeyuki Ito (1843–1914)
 31 October 1911 – Viscount Yoshika Inoue (1845–1929)
 21 April 1913 – Marquis Heihachiro Togo (1847–1934)
 7 July 1913 – Prince Takahito Arisugawa (1862–1913)
 26 May 1917 – Goro Ijuin (1852–1921)
 27 June 1922 – Prince Yorihito Higashi (1867–1922)
 8 January 1923 – Baron Hayao Shimamura (1858–1923)
 24 August 1923 – Baron Tomozaburo Kato (1861–1923)
 27 May 1932 – Prince Hiroyasu Fushimi (1876–1946)
 18 April 1943 – Isoroku Yamamoto (1884–1943)
 21 June 1943 – Osami Nagano (1880–1947)
 31 May 1944 – Mineichi Koga (1885–1944)

Korea
Yi Sunsin (1545–1598)

Ottoman Empire
 List of Ottoman Kapudan Pashas

Peru
 1967 – Miguel Grau Seminario (1834–1879) (posthumous)

Prussia
 Prince Adalbert (1811–1873)

Russian Empire

 1708 – General-Admiral Count Fyodor Apraksin (1661–1728)
 1727 – Admiral Generalissimus Prince Alexander Menshikov (1673–1729)
 1740 – General-Admiral Count Andrei Osterman (1686–1747)
 1756 – General-Admiral Prince Mikhail Golitsyn (1681–1764)
 1762 – General-Admiral Tsar Paul I (1754–1801)
 1784 – General-Field marshal Prince Grigori Potemkin (1739–1791)
 1796 – Navy General-Field marshal Count Ivan Chernyshyov (1726–1797)
 1831 – General-Admiral Grand Duke Konstantin Nikolayevich of Russia (1827–1892)
 1883 – General-Admiral Grand Duke Alexei Alexandrovich (1850–1908)

Russian Federation

Admirals of the fleet 
 1996 – Felix Gromov (1937-2021)
 2000 – Vladimir Kuroyedov (born 1944)
 2005 – Vladimir Masorin (born 1947)

Soviet Union

Admirals of the fleet 
 31 May 1944 – Nikolai Kuznetsov (1902–1974)  (demoted to rear admiral 3 February 1948, promoted to vice admiral 27 January 1951, reinstated 11 May 1953)
 31 May 1944 – Ivan Isakov (1894–1967) 
 18 June 1962 – Vladimir Kasatonov (1910–1989)
 28 April 1967 – Sergey Gorshkov (1910–1988) 
 30 April 1970 – Nikolai Sergeyev (1909–1999)
 28 July 1970 – Semyon Lobov (1913–1977)
 1973 – Georgiy Yegorov (1918–2008)
 5 November 1973 – Nikolai Smirnov (1917–1992)
 16 February 1982 – Alexei Sorokin (1922–2020)
 5 November 1983 – Vladimir Chernavin (born 1928)
 4 November 1988 – Ivan Kapitanets (1928–2018)
 4 November 1989 – Konstantin Makarov (1931–2011)

Admirals of the Fleet of the Soviet Union 
 03 March 1955 – Nikolai Kuznetsov (1902–1974) (demoted to vice admiral 17 February 1956, reinstated posthumously 26 July 1988)
 03 March 1955 – Ivan Isakov (1894–1967)
 28 October 1967 – Sergey Gorshkov (1910–1988)

Sri Lanka
Wasantha Karannagoda (born 1952) (Honorary rank)

Sweden
 King Charles XIII (1748–1818)
 King Oscar I (1799–1859)
 King Oscar II (1829–1907)

Thailand
 1910 – Prince Bhanurangsi Savangwongse (1859–1928) (Honorary rank)
 1917 – Prince Paribatra Sukhumbandhu (1881–1944)
 1941 – Plaek Phibunsongkhram (1897–1964) (Honorary rank)
 1956 – Prayoon Yuthasastrkosol (1905–1957)
 1959 – Sarit Thanarat (1908–1963) (Honorary rank)
 1964 – Thanom Kittikachorn (1911–2004) (Honorary rank)
 1973 – Praphas Charusathien (1912–1997) (Honorary rank)
 1992 – Queen Sirikit (born 1932) (Honorary rank)
 1998 – Prince Mahidol Adulyadej (1892–1929) (Honorary rank awarded posthumously, previously served in the Royal Thai Navy as a captain)

United Kingdom
 List of British admirals of the fleet

United States
 24 March 1903 (retroactive to 2 March, 1899) – George Dewey (1837–1917)
 15 December 1944 – William D. Leahy (1875–1959)
 17 December 1944 – Ernest King (1878–1956)
 19 December 1944 – Chester W. Nimitz (1885–1966)
 11 December 1945 – William Halsey Jr. (1882–1959)

Yugoslavia
 1983 – Branko Mamula (1921–2021)

Footnotes

Fleet